Raja Perempuan Tengku Anis binti Almarhum Tengku Abdul Hamid (born 6 January 1949) is the former Raja Perempuan (Queen consort) of Kelantan. She is the widow of Sultan Ismail Petra and the mother of Sultan Muhammad V. As a Queen dowager, she is now styled as Yang Maha Mulia Raja Perempuan Tengku Anis.

Biography
Tengku Anis was born on the 6th of January 1949 at Palm Manor, Kota Bharu to Tengku Abdul Hamid bin Tengku Muda Sulong Abdul Putra and his wife, Tengku Azizah binti Tengku Sri Maharaja Muhammad Hamzah. Her paternal grandfather, Tengku Abdul Putra, was the eldest son of the last reigning King of Jering, which was then one of the seven states in Southern Siam under Malay rule. Her maternal grandfather, Tengku Muhammad Hamzah, was the last Chief Minister of Kelantan appointed by the Sultan and the first post-independence Menteri Besar.

She received religious education from a personal tutor and completed her formal primary and secondary education at Zainab English School. She was conferred an Honorary Degree doctorate of Philosophy in Human Resources Development from the Ramkhamhaeng University, Thailand on the 26th of February 2005.

On 4 December 1968, Tengku Anis married Tengku Ismail Petra, the then-Tengku Mahkota (Crown Prince) of Kelantan at the Istana Kota Lama in Kota Bharu. Following this, she was bestowed the title of Tengku Ampuan Mahkota (Crown Princess) of Kelantan on the 1st of January 1969.

In 1979, Sultan Yahya Petra (at the time King of Malaysia) passed and Tengku Ismail Petra was installed the Sultan of Kelantan. She was installed as the Raja Perempuan (Queen consort) of Kelantan on the 30th of March 1979. Her husband, HRH Sultan Ismail Petra, reigned until the 13th of September 2010, and was succeeded by their eldest son, Tengku Muhammad Faris Petra.

Issue
The royal couple have four children:
Tengku Muhammad Faris Petra (born 6 October 1969) - later Sultan Muhammad V.
Tengku Muhammad Faiz Petra (born 20 January 1974) - Tengku Mahkota of Kelantan.
Tengku Muhammad Fakhry Petra (born 7 April 1978) - Tengku Bendahara of Kelantan.
Tengku Amalin A’ishah Putri (born 26 June 1984) - Tengku Maharani Putri.

Social contributions
Tengku Anis always pays serious attention to the welfare of the people and always shows a deep interest in the movement of charities in the state of Kelantan. She is the patron of various organisations such as:
 Founder of Darul Aitam Orphanage
 Founder of Tengku Anis Kindergarten
 Patron of Kelantan Foundation for the Disabled
 Patron of Kelantan Handicraft Foundation
 Patron of Kelantan Heart Patient Foundation

Honours 
She was awarded:

Honours of Kelantan 
  Recipient (DK) of the Royal Family Order (Al-Yunusi Star)
  Knight Grand Commander (SPMK) of the Order of the Crown of Kelantan (Al-Muhammadi Star)

Honours of Malaysia 
  :
  Member of the Royal Family Order of Kedah (DK)
  :
  Member of the Royal Family Order of Negeri Sembilan (DKNS)
  :
  Recipient of the Perlis Family Order of the Gallant Prince Syed Putra Jamalullail (DK)
  Knight Grand Commander of the Order of the Crown of Perlis or Star of Safi (SPMP, 1988)
  :
  First Class of the Royal Family Order of Johor (DK I)
  :
  Second Class of the Royal Family Order of Selangor (DK II)

Foreign honours 
  :
  Family Order of Laila Utama (DK)

Honorary degrees 
  :
 Honorary Doctor of Philosophy in Management from Kolej Universiti Sains dan Teknologi Malaysia - 23 February 2006
 Honorary Degree of Doctor of Agriculture Development from University Putra Malaysia - 16 September 2006
  : 
 Honorary Doctor of Philosophy in Human Resources Development from Ramkhamhaeng University - 26 February 2005

Places named after her 
Several places were named after her, including:
 Tengku Anis Hospital in Pasir Puteh, Kelantan
 Tengku Anis Kindergarten in Kota Bharu, Kelantan
 Tengku Anis Municipal Park in Kota Bharu, Kelantan
 Tengku Anis Orchid Park in Kota Bharu, Kelantan
 Tengku Anis Bazaar in Kota Bharu, Kelantan
 Tengku Anis Library, a library at Universiti Teknologi MARA, Machang, Kelantan
Pusat Dokumentasi Melayu Tengku Anis, Dewan Bahasa dan Pustaka Wilayah Timur in Kota Bharu, Kelantan

Ancestry

References

1949 births
Living people
Royal House of Kelantan
Malaysian people of Malay descent
Kelantan royal consorts
Malaysian Muslims
Raja Perempuan Tengku Anis
People from Kelantan
Malaysian people of Thai descent